Parliamentary elections were held in Greece on 20 October 1850. Supporters of Antonios Kriezis won a majority of the 131 seats. Kriezis remained Prime Minister.

Results

References

Greece
Parliamentary elections in Greece
1850 in Greece
Greece
1850s in Greek politics